David Pallas (born 1 July 1980) is a Swiss former footballer who played as a right-back. He last played for VfL Bochum in Germany's Bundesliga.

Early life
Born in A Laracha, Spain, Pallas began his youth career at FC Zürich, where he made the leap into the first team in 2001. During the winter break of the 2004–05 season, Pallas moved to league rivals FC Thun 1898, who qualified for the Champions League at the end of that season. He then moved to VfL Bochum, where he was a replacement for the injured right-back Søren Colding. As a reason for his move to VfL Bochum Pallas said that he sees a better prospect at the Ruhr club as well as financial benefits. After his first few games for VfL Bochum he again had to settle for a place on the bench. He played 21 league games and was wearing the shirt number 36. Pallas had a contract until 2007 and a one-year option, which was not activated. After an unsuccessful search for a new professional club and attending training camps at FC Wil and VDV in Duisburg he retired from professional football. From season 2014/15 Pallas plays at FC Ibach in the 2. Liga Inter.

Honours
FC Zürich
Swiss Cup: 1999–2000

References

External links
 
 

Living people
1980 births
Association football defenders
Spanish footballers
Swiss people of Spanish descent
Swiss men's footballers
FC Zürich players
FC Thun players
VfL Bochum players
VfL Bochum II players
Expatriate footballers in Germany
Bundesliga players
2. Bundesliga players